Michael George Bulmer FRS (born 10 May 1931) is a British biostatistician. He is an emeritus fellow of Wolfson College, Oxford, and a Fellow of the Royal Society of London. He is known for his work in quantitative genetics and on the biology of twinning, as well as for his 2003 biography of Francis Galton.

Biography
Bulmer was born in Birmingham, England, in 1931. After graduating from Rugby School, he studied at Merton College, Oxford, from 1949 to 1957, taking a B.A. in animal physiology in 1952, a diploma in applied statistics the following year, a D.Phil. in statistics in 1957, and a D.Sc. He then lectured at the University of Manchester from 1957 to 1959, after which he became a lecturer in biomathematics at the University of Oxford. In 1991, he left Oxford to become a professor in the Department of Biological Sciences at Rutgers University, where he remained until 1995.

References

External links
Faculty page

1931 births
Living people
English statisticians
20th-century British biologists
Biostatisticians
Fellows of Wolfson College, Oxford
Academics of the University of Oxford
Academics of the University of Manchester
Rutgers University faculty
Alumni of the University of Oxford
People educated at Rugby School
People from Birmingham, West Midlands
Theoretical biologists
English biologists
Fellows of the Royal Society
Alumni of Merton College, Oxford